Khuda Ki Basti, meaning God's Own City, may refer to:

 Khuda Ki Basti (Karachi) a neighborhood of Karachi, Sindh, Pakistan
 Khuda Ki Basti (film)
 Khuda Ki Basti (novel) by Shaukat Siddiqui
 Khuda Ki Basti (serial), based on the novel